DC Bank/Probaclac is a Canadian UCI Continental cycling team established in 2012.

Team roster

References

External links

UCI Continental Teams (America)
Cycling teams established in 2012
Cycling teams based in Canada